These are the matches that Italian football club Sampdoria have played in European football competitions.

Summary
The Genoese club have won one continental title: the Cup Winners' Cup in 1990, overcoming  Anderlecht in Gothenburg. 

This victory came during the greatest period of success in the history of the club, largely under coach Vujadin Boškov and featuring players such as Pagliuca, Mancini, Vialli, Vierchowod and Lombardo. In the 1988–89 Cup Winners' Cup they had finished runners-up to FC Barcelona in the Bern final, but in the same season won the Coppa Italia (one of four domestic cup wins from six finals in nine years), allowing another opportunity to compete for the European prize, which they duly achieved the following year. In the 1994–95 edition of the same tournament, Samp reached the semi-final before being eliminated on penalties by Arsenal.

In addition, Sampdoria won their only Serie A national title in 1991, and in the subsequent European Cup campaign they went all the way to the final in London, again facing Barcelona and losing by a single goal late in extra time. It was the last year before that competition became known as the Champions League, although its format did involve a group stage.

Since the mid-1990s, the club's European involvement has been less frequent and less prominent, although they have participated in the group stages of the UEFA Cup / Europa League on three occasions in the early 21st century (failing to progress each time).

UEFA-organised seasonal competitions
Sampdoria's score listed first.

European Cup/Champions League

European Cup Winners' Cup/UEFA Cup Winners' Cup

UEFA Cup/Europa League

UEFA Intertoto Cup

European Super Cup

FIFA-only recognized seasonal competitions

Inter-Cities Fairs Cup

Overall record

UEFA Competitions record
Accurate as of 27 August 2017

Source: UEFA.comPld = Matches played; W = Matches won; D = Matches drawn; L = Matches lost; GF = Goals for; GA = Goals against; GD = Goal Difference.

References

European football
Sampdoria